Scheme In One Defun, or humorously Scheme In One Day (SIOD) is a programming language, a dialect of the language Lisp, a small-size implementation of the dialect Scheme, written in C and designed to be embedded inside C programs. It is notable for being perhaps the smallest practical implementation of a Lisp-like language. It was written by George J. Carrette originally. It is free and open-source software released under a GNU Lesser General Public License (LGPL).

Features 
SIOD features include:
 Implements the original version of Scheme from the Lambda Papers, but none of the modern language standards.
 Represents a very early use of conservative garbage collection in a Lisp interpreter, a method later copied by SCM and Guile.
 Compiling is implemented by emitting a fixed machine code prologue followed by a fast-loading binary representation of the parse tree to be interpreted.

Applications 
 GNU Image Manipulation Program (GIMP) – SIOD was its primary extension language, Script-Fu, until GIMP 2.4 was released.
 Siag Office – Scheme in a Grid (SIAG) is a spreadsheet application using SIOD as a base.
 Festival Speech Synthesis System – SIOD is its underlying command interpreter.

References

External links 

SIOD on CodePlex

Scheme (programming language) interpreters
Scheme (programming language) implementations